Vopolo Havoka is a populated place situated in the Sells District of the Papago Indian Reservation in Pima County, Arizona, United States. Historically, it has also been known as Burro Pond, Burro Pond Village, Burro Pond Villages, and Vopelohavooka. Its current name became official per a decision by the Board on Geographic Names in 1941. The term vopolo havoka is the O'odham term meaning "burro pond".

References

Populated places in Pima County, Arizona